Franklin is a small township on the western side of the Huon River in the south-east of Tasmania, between Huonville and Geeveston. At the 2021 census, Franklin had a population of 444.

It was named after Sir John Franklin and his wife Lady Jane Franklin who subdivided a large property there formerly owned by John Price to settle families of modest means.  The Franklins had a ketch named Huon Pine built at Port Davey to provide a direct link between the settlement at Hobart.

Huon Post Office opened on 31 August 1848, was renamed Franklin-Huon in 1853 and Franklin in 1878.

Originally used for mixed cropping, especially potatoes and other vegetables, by the late 19th century Franklin and its immediate surrounds were a major apple orcharding region.  With the collapse of Tasmania's export fruit industry during the 1970s the region reverted to mixed farming.

Until the 1930s Franklin was the major town in the Huon Valley. It was thriving with the shipping that docked at its many jetties. Franklin boasted its own Court House (now a gourmet café), several hotels, banks and a Town Hall (now the restored Palais Theatre). It even had its own hydroelectric power station, driven by a local creek. With the establishment of a better road across the Sleeping Beauty Range mountains and the growth of the nearby town Huonville, Franklin went into decline over the next few decades. 
However, it has recently had a resurgence as a popular tourist town and has had an influx of interstate 'Seachangers' (urban dwellers from large Australian cities such as Sydney looking for a slower pace and place to raise their children) who have revitalised the town. Much of old Franklin remains.

References

See also

Towns in Tasmania
Southern Tasmania
Localities of Huon Valley Council